Upload is an American science fiction comedy-drama television series created by Greg Daniels. The series premiered on May 1, 2020, on Amazon Prime Video and was renewed for a second season. The second season premiered on March 11, 2022; it had seven episodes, three fewer than the first. In May 2022, the series was renewed for a third season.

Premise
In 2033, humans can "upload" themselves into a virtual afterlife of their choosing. When computer programmer Nathan Brown dies prematurely, he is uploaded to the very expensive Lakeview, but then finds himself under the thumb of his possessive, still-living girlfriend Ingrid. As Nathan adjusts to the pros and cons of digital heaven, he bonds with Nora, his living customer service rep. Nora struggles with the pressures of her job, her dying father who does not want to be uploaded, and her growing feelings for Nathan while slowly coming to believe that Nathan was murdered.

Cast and characters

Main
 Robbie Amell as Nathan Brown, a 27-year-old computer engineering grad and newly deceased computer programmer who is uploaded to the digital afterlife Lakeview.
 Andy Allo as Nora Antony, a living woman who is Nathan's handler in his afterlife
 Allegra Edwards as Ingrid Kannerman, Nathan's materialistic, obsessive girlfriend
 Zainab Johnson as Aleesha, Nora's coworker who is Luke's handler
 Kevin Bigley as Luke, a former army corporal and Lakeview resident who befriends Nathan and is dating Mildred
 Josh Banday as Ivan (season 2; recurring season 1), Nora's coworker

Recurring

 Jordan Johnson-Hinds as Jamie, Nathan's best friend and business partner
 Chris Williams as Dave Antony, Nora's father
 Christine Ko as Mandi, Nora's roommate
 Jessica Tuck as Viv, Nathan's mother
  Philip Granger as Uncle Larry, Viv's brother and Nathan's favorite uncle
 William B. Davis as David Choak, a wealthy man living across the hall from Nathan
 Elizabeth Bowen as Fran Booth, Nathan's awkward cousin who is investigating his car accident
 Andy Thompson as Lionel Winters (identified only as the Professor in season 1)
 Chloe Coleman as Nevaeh, Nathan's niece
 Julian Christopher as Ernie, a Horizen therapist whose avatar in Lakeview is a Labrador retriever
 Rhys Slack as Dylan, a child who lives in Lakeview after falling into the Grand Canyon and is trapped in the form of a 12-year-old despite being uploaded six years prior
 Matt Ward as Byron, Nora's casual sex partner
 Barclay Hope as Oliver Kannerman, Ingrid's father
 Yvetta Fisher as Batia, Nora's coworker
 Megan Ferguson (pilot), Hilary Jardine (season 1), and Vic Michaelis (season 2) as Mildred, Ingrid's centenarian grandmother who resides in Lakeview, and whose avatar was based on an old black and white photograph
 Scott Patey as Josh Pitzer, an executive hoping to buy Nathan's and Jamie's software
 Paulo Costanzo as Matteo (season 2)
 Mackenzie Cardwell as Tinsley, a temp hired by Aleesha (season 2)
 Owen Daniels as A.I. Guy, a virtual employee at Lakeview who can appear in many places at once; also later as Boris Netherlands, an unemployed actor who was paid for his likeness to be used in Lakeview
 Andrea Rosen as Lucy, Nora and Aleesha's domineering boss

Guest

 Justin Stone as Dan the Orbit Gum Guy
 Philip Granger as Uncle Larry
 Phoebe Miu as Yang
 Brea St. James as Older (female) Dylan
 Peter James Smith as Mauricio, a digital afterlife salesman
 Lucas Wyka as Jack Kannerman
 Matt Braunger as Brad
 Wayne Wilderson as Zach
 Creed Bratton as Rupert Tilford
 Larry Wilmore as Mr. Whitbridge
 Gigi Gorgeous as Jordan
 Jennifer Garner as Officer Jennifer Garner 
 Hiro Kanagawa as Detective Sato

Episodes

Series overview

Season 1 (2020)

Season 2 (2022)

Production

Development
On September 8, 2017, Amazon announced it had ordered a pilot for a new single-camera comedy series created by Greg Daniels. On July 28, 2018, Amazon announced it had given the production an order for a first season of ten episodes. Daniels and Howard Klein are executive producers, and the series is produced by 3 Arts Entertainment. On May 8, 2020, Amazon renewed the series for a second season, which premiered March 11, 2022. On May 11, 2022, the series was renewed for a third season.

Casting
In January 2018, it was announced that Robbie Amell and Andy Allo had received the pilot's male and female lead roles.

While the series was filming its second season in February–March 2021, Paulo Costanzo and Mackenzie Cardwell were cast in recurring roles. At the release-date announcement, it was also confirmed that Amell, Allo, Allegra Edwards, Zainab Johnson and Kevin Bigley would return; and Josh Banday, who recurred in Season 1, was promoted to a series regular.

Filming
Season 1's principal photography took place from March 5 to May 10, 2019, in Vancouver, Canada.

Some exterior photography for the Lakeview virtual reality world was shot at Mohonk Mountain House and Preserve in New Paltz, New York, including images of the hotel, groundskeeper, and lake. A small number of interior shots, including rooms at the hotel, were also filmed on location.

Season 2 was filmed from January 25 to April 15, 2021.

Season 3 was filmed from August 15, 2022, to November 2, 2022.

Reception
Upload received positive reviews. On Rotten Tomatoes, the first season has an approval rating of 88% with an average score of 6.9 out of 10 based on reviews from 56 critics. The website's critical consensus is, "Though Upload at times suffers from tonal overload, witty writing and a winsome cast make it an afterlife worth living." On Metacritic, the season has a weighted average score of 67 out of 100, based on 22 critics, indicating "generally favorable" reviews.

The second season has received an approval rating of 100% with an average score of 7.4/10 based on 10 critics on Rotten Tomatoes. The website's critical consensus is, 
"Upload’s sophomore season goes into sleep mode just when it's revving up, but even a truncated installment of this techno afterlife makes for terrific comedy."
Meanwhile, on Metacritic it received a weighted average score of 72 out of 100, based on 4 critics, indicating "generally favorable" reviews.

References

Further reading

External links
 
 
 Official season 2 finale screenplay

2020 American television series debuts
2020s American comic science fiction television series
2020s American satirical television series
English-language television shows
Fiction about consciousness transfer
Amazon Prime Video original programming
Television series by 3 Arts Entertainment
Television series by Amazon Studios
Fiction about the afterlife
Fiction set in 2033
Fiction set in the 2030s
Transhumanism in television series
Television series set in the 2030s
Television shows filmed in Vancouver
Television series created by Greg Daniels
Television shows set in Los Angeles
Television shows set in New York City